was a Japanese professional drifting driver who competed in the D1 Grand Prix series for Team Toyo with River Side. He died on 2 February 2010 during the evening due to a motorcycle accident.

He loved cars from an early age and dreamed of getting his license, when he did the first car he got was a four-wheel drive as he was into WRC at the time. He enjoyed dirt driving but ran out of money for repairs to his car so he bought a Nissan Silvia (S13) and turned to drifting. He practiced a lot but as he mainly did it alone he couldn't tell whether he was any good, so he studied the drift bible and some other books on drifting to try to improve. Though he never knew whether he was any good until he began competing against other people. He was the manager of the River Side Tuning Garage in the Osaka prefecture, so he sponsored himself.

He competed in the D1 Grand Prix series since it began in 2001, until his death before the 2010 season. He always used a Nissan Silvia (S13) as he loved the way they drift. The Silvias he used in the D1GP are not usual, his old one had an RB26 from a Nissan Skyline GT-R and his current car has a 1.5JZ from a Toyota Chaser, as he liked the bigger displacement engines.

Death

On the evening of 1 February 2010 Kuroi was hit by another vehicle while travelling home from work on his motorcycle. Kuroi later died in the hospital after bleeding to death from injuries to his thigh.

A memorial for Kuroi was featured at the Osaka Auto Messe.

Complete drifting results

D1 Grand Prix

References

External links
JDM Option
D1 Grand Prix
D1 Supporter profile
TougeNW Tribute

1969 births
2010 deaths
D1 Grand Prix drivers
Drifting drivers
Japanese racing drivers
Motorcycle road incident deaths
Road incident deaths in Japan